Georgios Kokolakis (born 3 September 1960) is a former Greek footballer who currently works for Greek giants Olympiacos, as a Scout.

Honours

 Olympiacos
 Greek Championship: 1979–80, 1980–81, 1981–82, 1982–83, 1986–87
 Greek Cup: 1980–81
 Greek Super Cup: 1980, 1987

References

Olympiacos F.C. players
1960 births
Living people
Association football fullbacks
Footballers from Heraklion
Greek footballers